Ibrahim Al-Kaebi (Arabic:إبراهيم الكعبي; born 3 March 1993) is an Emirati footballer. He currently plays as a goalkeeper for Al Urooba on loan from Al Ain.

References

External links
 

Emirati footballers
1993 births
Living people
Al Wahda FC players
Emirates Club players
Al Dhafra FC players
Fujairah FC players
Dibba Al-Hisn Sports Club players
Al Ain FC players
Al Urooba Club players
Place of birth missing (living people)
UAE Pro League players
UAE First Division League players
Association football goalkeepers